Ashleigh Guest (born 10 April 1990) is a retired Australian rules footballer who played for Greater Western Sydney, Melbourne, and the Western Bulldogs in the AFL Women's (AFLW). Guest was drafted by the Greater Western Sydney Giants with their second selection and sixteenth overall in the 2016 AFL Women's draft. She made her debut in the thirty-six point loss to Adelaide at Thebarton Oval in the opening round of the 2017 season. She played every match in her debut season to finish with seven games. She was traded to the Melbourne Football Club at the conclusion of the 2017 season.

In April 2019, Guest was traded to the Western Bulldogs while Libby Birch joined Melbourne. It was revealed that Guest had signed a contract extension with the club on 16 June 2021, after playing every game possible for the club that season.

In May 2022, Guest retired from football after playing 40 games with three clubs.

Statistics
Statistics are correct to the end of the 2021 season.

|- style=background:#EAEAEA
| scope=row | 2017 ||  || 16
| 7 || 1 || 0 || 46 || 22 || 68 || 13 || 29 || 0.0 || 0.0 || 6.6 || 3.1 || 9.7 || 1.9 || 4.1 || 0
|-
| scope=row | 2018 ||  || 16
| 7 || 0 || 0 || 29 || 20 || 49 || 7 || 20 || 0.0 || 0.0 || 4.1 || 2.9 || 7.0 || 1.0 || 2.9 || 0
|- style=background:#EAEAEA
| scope=row | 2019 ||  || 16
| 4 || 0 || 0 || 10 || 12 || 22 || 3 || 8 || 0.0 || 0.0 || 2.5 || 3.0 || 5.5 || 0.8 || 2.0 || 0
|-
| scope=row | 2020 ||  || 16
| 3 || 0 || 0 || 13 || 10 || 23 || 6 || 6 || 0.0 || 0.0 || 4.3 || 3.3 || 7.7 || 2.0 || 2.0 || 0
|- style=background:#EAEAEA
| scope=row | 2021 ||  || 16
| 9 || 0 || 0 || 70 || 22 || 92 || 23 || 15 || 0.0 || 0.0 || 7.8 || 2.4 || 10.2 || 2.6 || 1.7 || 0
|- class=sortbottom
! colspan=3 | Career
! 30 !! 0 !! 0 !! 168 !! 86 !! 254 !! 52 !! 78 !! 0.0 !! 0.0 !! 5.6 !! 2.9 !! 8.5 !! 1.7 !! 2.6 !! 0
|}

References

External links 

1990 births
Living people
Greater Western Sydney Giants (AFLW) players
Melbourne Football Club (AFLW) players
Australian rules footballers from Victoria (Australia)
Victorian Women's Football League players
Western Bulldogs (AFLW) players